Hanbury Island is one of the uninhabited Canadian arctic islands in Kivalliq Region, Nunavut, Canada. It is one of several islands located in Chesterfield Inlet.

References

Islands of Chesterfield Inlet
Uninhabited islands of Kivalliq Region